Parkash Memorial Deaf & Dumb School, also referred to as the PM Deaf and Dumb School, is a school for deaf-mute children in the city of Ropar in the Panjab. It is run by the Parkash Memorial Deaf and Dumb Handicapped Welfare Society [Regd.], and Mrs Adarsh Sharma is the current principal of the school. Panjabi is the primary language of the school.

Established in 2007, the school has 178 students, including 75 girls. Affiliated with the Punjab School Education Board, the school provides education up to 10th class and also some courses.

References

External links
"ਗੂੰਗੇ ਅਤੇ ਬੋਲਿਆਂ ਦੀ ਸੰਸਥਾ ਦਾ ਅਚਨਚੇਤ ਦੌਰਾ", Daily Ajit, Sunday, 14 July 2016, Punjab, India
"Physically challenged youth gets his due ", Chandigarh Tribune, Friday, 10 April 2009, Chandigarh, India
"ਚੀਮਾ ਵਲੋ ਸਪੀਚ ਥੈਰੇਪੀ ਕਮਰੇ ਦਾ ਊਦਘਾਟਨ", Punjabi Tribune, Friday, 4 March 2016, Ropar, Punjab, India

Schools for the deaf in India
Schools in Punjab, India
Rupnagar
Educational institutions established in 2007
2007 establishments in Punjab, India